Kayacık is a village in the Çavdır District of Burdur Province in Turkey. Its population is 407 (2021).

References

Villages in Çavdır District